Kandharapur is a village in Azamgarh District, Uttar Pradesh, India.

References

Villages in Azamgarh district